KRNY (102.3 FM) is a country music station in Kearney, Nebraska. The NRG Media outlet operates at 102.3 MHz with an effective radiated power (ERP) of 77.1 kW. Known as "Nebraska Hot Country 102", the weekday lineup includes the morning show "The ScottyO Show", Middays with Bicklemyer, Afternoons with Melissa Free on "The 5'clock stampede", and evenings with The Big Time with Whitney Allen. Weekends are highlighted by "The Hits Lists" Wit Fitz, "American Christian Music Revue", and "New Music Nashville".

External links
 KRNY/Y102 Website
 

RNY
Country radio stations in the United States
NRG Media radio stations